Lister Region is a region in Southern Norway. It consist of the municipalities Farsund, Flekkefjord, Hægebostad, Kvinesdal, Lyngdal, and Sirdal. The region borders to Kristiansand Region in the east, Setesdal  to the north, and Rogaland County to the west. There are two towns in Lister: Flekkefjord and Farsund.

Municipalities

Media gallery

References 

Regions of Norway
Farsund
Flekkefjord
Sirdal
Kvinesdal
Lyngdal
Hægebostad